Il Silenzio may refer to:

Il silenzio, an album by Dalida
Il Silenzio (song), a song by Nini Rosso